Frunk may refer to:

People
 Frunk Murnis, alias of Frank Morris (speedcuber)
 Brandon Frunk, a mixed martial artist who had a bout in SFL 50, see 2014–2016 in SFL numbered events
 Hans Von Frunk, a German high officer in the Spanish Civil War at the Badajoz massacre

Media
 Frunk (record), a series of live albums by Bob Schneider
 Frunk (film), a 2003 short film from Kristian Eidnes Andersen
 Frunk (song), a 2010 song by Adebisi Shank off the album This Is the Second Album of a Band Called Adebisi Shank

Other uses
 Trunk (car), the front trunk of a vehicle